William Montague was an Anglican cleric at Old North Church in Boston and St. Paul's in Dedham, Massachusetts.

Personal life
Montague was born in South Hadley, Massachusetts on September 23, 1757 to Joseph and Sarah Henry Montague. He was graduated from Dartmouth College in 1784.

He was married to Jane Little. Their daughter, also named Jane Little Montague, was a teacher at the Mill Village School and the First Middle School in Dedham. Another daughter, Sarah Ann Montague, taught in the East Street School. She had a son who served in the Civil War as a captain in the 38th Infantry Regiment.

While in England, Montague obtained the musket ball that killed Joseph Warren. His son, William Henry Montague, donated it to the New England Historic Genealogical Society, an organization he helped found. Montague also fought in the Revolutionary War.

He died in Dedham July 22, 1833.

Ministry
He was ordained by Bishop Samuel Seabury of Connecticut. Montague was rector of Old North Church in Boston from 1787 to 1792. After traveling to London in 1790, he became the first minister ordained in America to occupy a pulpit of the English Church.

In May 1777, Rev. William Clark, a Tory, was charged by the Board of Selectmen in Dedham of being a traitor to the American Revolution. He was arrested and jailed for 10 weeks on a prison ship. In June 1778, Fisher Ames obtained a pass for him and Clark was allowed to leave America. It was not until 1791 that the congregation regrouped and called Montague.

Montague received a salary in Dedham of £100 sterling. He remained in the Dedham church until 1818. He lived on the south side High Street, near the intersection with East Street.

Teaching career
Monatague taught in the First Middle School for three winters in 1793–94, 1794–95, and 1795–96. In 1800, he taught in Dorchester. He is said to have excelled as a teacher of mathematics.

Notes

References

Works cited

Clergy from Dedham, Massachusetts
Clergy from Boston
Dartmouth College alumni
Educators from Dedham, Massachusetts
People from South Hadley, Massachusetts
1757 births
1833 deaths
Anglican clergy
Military personnel from Dedham, Massachusetts
People of Massachusetts in the American Revolution